Central Radio is a British Independent Local Radio serving The Fylde, Preston, Leyland and Chorley areas of Lancashire.

The station launched on 25 September 2008, having changed its name prior to launch from Proud FM, derived from Proud Preston on the city shield to Central Radio in order to better reflect the transmission area.

Ownership history

UTV
Central Radio launched on 25 September 2008. Following Ofcom relaxations on local programming requirements, the station began taking UTV Radio's networked evening and overnight shows in late March 2009.

On 16 December 2009, it was announced by owners UTV Media that the station would be closing on Christmas Eve of that year (24 December) and the station's broadcasting licence returned to the UK broadcasting regulator, Ofcom. UTV cited the unfortunate launch of the station in the midst of a recession as a primary reason for the decision, and the station's consequent unprofitability. UTV did not anticipate the station becoming viable for the foreseeable future, saying:

Niocom
On 24 December 2009, the day that Central Radio was scheduled to close, it was announced that a buyer had been found, revealed to be competitor Niocom in January 2010. The company also operated the neighbouring Southport station Dune FM at the time of the sale. On 12 January 2010, the station co-emplaced and began to share resources with sister station Dune FM.

A month later, OFCOM granted permission for Central Radio to co-locate with sister station Dune FM in Southport. Programme management, production, administrative, engineering and management resources were to be shared between the two stations, but the programming on Central Radio remained editorially focused on the Preston, Leyland and Chorley areas.

In December 2010, Niocom sold Dune FM, and from 1 February 2011 the programming syndication ended with Central Radio becoming as a fully independent service.

UKRD
On 14 June 2011 it was announced that UKRD, owners of the 107 The Bee in neighbouring Blackburn had purchased the Central Radio licence and planned to merge the service with its East Lancashire station 107 The Bee.

Three days later, Central Radio ceased broadcasting with Drivetime presenter - Leyland born Andy Hilbert - playing the final record, Unforgettable by Nat King Cole. On 1 July 2011, 106.5fm became a simulcast of The Bee but with local news and adverts.

Relaunch in 2022
On the 1st September 2022 Central Radio relaunched across the Fylde Coast broadcasting from the new Blackpool MUX at the top of Blackpool Tower. The station launched with a number of familiar former local radio presenters.

For the launch, the radio station offered a holiday to Las Vegas as a prize.

2022 Current Presenters
 Danny Matthews (formerly at Heart North Lancashire & Cumbria)
 Chris Kirk (formerly at Heart North Lancashire & Cumbria)
 Dom Molloy (formerly at The Revolution (radio_station))
 Mark Walker (formerly at Smooth Lake District)
 Lindsey Kerr (formerly at Smooth Lake District)
 Martin Emery (formerly at Radio Wave 96.5)
 James Macdonald
 Nathan Hill (presenter and owner)

Past presenters
 Aaron Roscoe (Now at Signal 1)
 Aidan Bracken (Now at Dune FM)
 Andy Hilbert (Now at 107 The Bee)
 Anna Woolhouse (Now at Lincs FM)
 Brendan Kearney (Now at 96.2 The Revolution)
 Brent Williams (Now at Dune FM)
 Chris Buckley (Now at Signal 1)
 Dave Asher (Now at Peak FM)
 Dave Turley (Now at Dune FM)
 David Duffy (Now at Lincs FM)
 John Cooper (Now at Rother FM)
 Jon Holling (Now at Tower FM)
 Kim Shaw (Now at Heart)
 Mark Blackman (Now at Silk 106.9)
 Mark Keen (Now at RadioWave 96.5)
 Neil Jackson (Now at Dune FM)
 Olly Houldsworth (Now at 107 The Bee)
 Paul Harvey (Now at Peak FM)
 Paul Jordan (Now at Hallam FM)
 Paul Tasker (Now at Dune FM)
 Phil Johnson (Now at RadioWave 96.5)
 Phil King (Now at Mighty Radio)
 Rob Charles (Now at Sandgrounder Radio, Great Yorkshire Radio & Forever FM on Peter Kay's Car Share BBC1)
 Scott Goldsworthy
 Scott Wright (Now at 107 The Bee)
 Steve Bradshaw (Now at RadioWave 96.5)
 Steve Crumley (Now at Tower FM)

See also
 List of radio stations in the United Kingdom

References

External links
 Official website
 Predicted coverage area

Mass media in Preston
Radio stations in Lancashire
Radio stations established in 2008
Radio stations disestablished in 2011
Defunct radio stations in the United Kingdom